As an agglutinative language, Turkish allows the construction of words by adding many suffixes to a word stem. It is derived from the noun  ('success') and means 'As though you are from those whom we may not be able to easily make into a maker of unsuccessful ones'. It was used in a contrived story designed to use this word.

In comparison, the word  has 12 letters, so it should be possible to use various other suffixes to make an even longer word from these ones. Therefore,  can be added as a suffix to any meaningful Turkish noun. For example,  is another possible longest meaningful and probable word in Turkish with 81 letters.

On the other hand,  is a surname with 50 letters, considered to be the longest surname in Turkish. Therefore, if words derived from surnames are included,  is accepted as the longest meaningful and probable word in Turkish with 117 letters and it means 'As though you happen to have been from among those whom we will not be able to easily/quickly make a maker of  family'.

There is no principled grammatical reason for not being able to make a Turkish word indefinitely long, as there are suffixes that can act recursively on a word stem. In practice, however, such words would become unintelligible after a few cycles of recursion.

Grammar

Turkish grammar is highly agglutinative, enabling the construction of words by stringing together various morphemes. It is theoretically possible for some words to be inflected an infinite number of times because certain suffixes generate words of the same type as the stem word, such that the new word can be modified again with the same suffix(es). An example for such a recursive pattern is:  
 ev-de-ki-nin-ki-ler-de-ki . . .
 house-LOC-REL-POS3s-REL-PLU-LOC-REL . .
 ... the one of the one in the one at the house.

Thus, case and possessive suffixes interspersed with the -ki- suffix can be added indefinitely to a noun, although in practice this would not be observed more than a few times. 

The causative morpheme can also be used recursively to generate indefinitely long words that are grammatically valid. This morpheme shows quite some irregularity, taking one of six forms depending on the verb root. Otherwise it alternates between -Dır (D=d or t, I=ı,i,u or ü) and -t depending on the preceding letter.
 piş-ir-di-ler             = they cooked it
 piş-ir-t-ti-ler           = they caused it to be cooked (they had it cooked) 
 piş-ir-t-tir-di-ler       = they caused it to be caused to be cooked (they had someone have it cooked)
 piş-ir-t-tir-t-ti-ler     = they caused it to be caused to be caused to be cooked (they had someone have someone have it cooked)
 piş-ir-t-tir-t-tir-di-ler = they caused it to be caused to be caused to be caused to be cooked (they had someone have someone have someone have it cooked)
Multiple usage of this suffix is rare, but there is no theoretical reason to put a limit to its use.

History 

The tongue twister  is often said to be the longest word in Turkish, despite in written form appearing to be two separate words. This is because the question particle  is by convention separated from the verb, despite being considered part of it. It means 'Are you one of those people whom we could not make to be Czechoslovakian?' A slight modification, (43 letters; 'you are reportedly one of those that we could not make Czechoslovakian') is, however, even longer and, as it contains no question particle, it is written contiguously. 

After the dissolution of Czechoslovakia,  (53 letters) was often said to be the longest word in Turkish. It means 'As if you are one of the people that we made to be originating from Afyonkarahisar'. After the publication of longer words in popular media, it lost its popularity.

Muvaffakiyetsizleştiricileştiriveremeyebileceklerimizdenmişsinizcesine 
The word  (70 letters) was proposed by Köksal Karakuş as the longest word in Turkish.
Its use is illustrated by the following situation:

           " "
''We are in a teachers' training school that has evil purposes. The teachers who are being educated in that school are being taught how to make unsuccessful ones from students. So, one by one, teachers are being educated as makers of unsuccessful ones. However, one of those teachers refuses to be maker-of-unsuccessful-ones, in other words, to be made a maker-of-unsuccessful-ones; he talks about and criticizes the school's stand on the issue. The headmaster who thinks every teacher can be made easily/quickly into a maker-of-unsuccessful-ones gets angry. He invites the teacher to his room and says "You are talking as if you were one of those we can not easily/quickly turn into a maker-of-unsuccessful-ones, right?"

Word formation

See also 
 Agglutination
 Longest word in English
 Longest word in French
 Longest word in Romanian
 Longest word in Spanish
 Longest words

References 

Turkish words and phrases
Word in Turkish
Turkish